Major-General Paul Gleadell  (1910–1988) was a British Army officer.

Military career
Gleadell was commissioned into the Devonshire Regiment on 28 August 1930. He commanded the 12th Battalion, the Devonshire Regiment during its crossing of the Rhine in March 1945 during the Second World War for which he was appointed a Companion of the Distinguished Service Order. After the war he became General Staff Officer (Intelligence) at General Headquarters Far East Land Forces in July 1950, Commander of 24th Infantry Brigade in July 1955 and Chief of Staff (Operations) at Land Forces, Cyprus in May 1958 during the Cyprus Emergency. After that he became General Officer Commanding 44th (Home Counties) Division in January 1954 and then Director of Infantry in February 1962 before retiring in February 1965.

References

1910 births
1988 deaths
British Army major generals
Companions of the Order of the Bath
Commanders of the Order of the British Empire
Companions of the Distinguished Service Order
Devonshire Regiment officers
British Army personnel of World War II